Victor Danielsen Norman (born 18 July 1946 in Risør) is a Norwegian economist, politician for the Conservative Party and newspaper columnist. He is a retired professor of economics at the Norwegian School of Economics (NHH) and former Chairman of the Institute for Research in Economics and Business Administration.

Academics
Victor Norman earned his bachelor's degree from Yale University and his PhD from Massachusetts Institute of Technology in 1972. Among his academic advisers were Charles P. Kindleberger, Paul A. Samuelson and Jagdish N. Bhagwati.

His book co-authored with Avinash K. Dixit, Theory of International Trade: A Dual, General Equilibrium Approach, is an application of the microeconomic principle of duality to trade theory, which William J. Baumol has called a clear, detailed, important contribution to the academic understanding of international trade. He was appointed professor of economics at NHH in 1975.

Victor Norman served as rector at NHH from August 1999 till October 2001. He was preceded in this position by Carl Julius Norstrøm and succeeded by Per Ivar Gjærum. He is a member of the Norwegian Academy of Science and Letters.

Politics
From 19 October 2001 to 8 March 2004 he served as Minister of Labour and Government Administration in the second cabinet Bondevik. Among the issues he passed in his term was the removal of point accrual on frequent flyer programs for domestic flights and the relocation of several government agencies from Oslo to other cities and towns across Norway.

References

1946 births
Living people
Microeconomists
Norwegian economists
Norwegian columnists
Government ministers of Norway
Conservative Party (Norway) politicians
Academic staff of the Norwegian School of Economics
Rectors of the Norwegian School of Economics
Members of the Norwegian Academy of Science and Letters
Massachusetts Institute of Technology alumni
Yale University alumni
People from Risør